Esther Nyawa Lungu (born 2 June 1956) is a well-known public figure from Zambia, who served as the First Lady of the country from 25 January 2015 to 24 August 2021. She is the wife of the former Zambian president Edgar Lungu, and together they have six children. Born on 2 June 1956, her parents originally hailed from Zambia's Eastern Province.

While she was raised Catholic, Esther Nyawa Lungu and her husband are currently practicing Baptists. In 2015, she travelled to the United States to participate in a series of events, including the First Ladies' and women's summits at the George W. Bush Institute in Dallas, Texas, and the United Nations in New York City. At the Invest in Women conference in Dallas, Esther Nyawa Lungu was a distinguished panellist, with the session being moderated by Cherie Blair.

During her tenure as the First Lady of Zambia, Esther Nyawa Lungu was an advocate against child marriage. In December 2015, she established the Esther Lungu Foundation, where she serves as the chairman and mentor. The foundation's primary objective is to empower women and children in Zambia.

Early life
Esther Phiri was born on 2 June, to Agnes and Island Phiri, who were originally from the country's Eastern Province. She was raised Catholic, but she and her husband are now practicing Baptists. She said, "When we first met, Edgar had his UCZ hymn books while I had my catholic catechism books, until we eventually found common ground in the Baptist faith."

State visits
Edgar Lungu became a junior minister in 2011, Minister of Home affairs on 9 July 2012 and Defence minister on 24 December 2013 from the United Party for National Development. Lungu was adopted as the candidate for the Patriotic Front during the January 2015 presidential by-election, following Sata's death. He narrowly defeated the opposition candidate and was sworn-in as the President of Zambia on 25 January 2015 and his wife Esther became the First Lady of Zambia.

Being the First Lady, Esther was part of many state visits along with the President. During 2015, she attended a series of meeting in the United States of America and she was invited by the George W. Bush Institute to participate in first lady conference and discuss topics of women's empowerment, health and technology. She was invited by the health minister of the Kingdom of Saudi Arabia and by Princess Latifa Bint Abulazis Al Saud to discuss support for women and child welfare programmes in Zambia. As a part of her continual humanitarian work, she launched Esther Lungu Foundation in December 2015.

Social activities
Lungu launched a trust fund which seeks to reduce vulnerability of the underprivileged persons using gender sensitive, participatory and environmentally sustainable approaches to improve their livelihoods. The Esther Lungu Foundation Trust (ELFT) aims to leverage its position to address issues relating to economic empowerment, maternity, children, neo-natal health, and water sanitation.

The ELFT, with the Muslim Social and Welfare Trust, installed hand pumps with boreholes in many places in Chongwe District. The district was facing acute water shortage as the reserves in Chongwe River reduced. It started identifying vulnerable families, where empowering women might eradicate poverty in the country. It began work with the ministries of Community Development and General Education to enrol schoolchildren.

Lungu suggested hand soap can reduce one out of every three cases of childhood diarrhea. She has advocated for bettering the lives of Zambia's older women, and donated 30,000K to six women's association in Chilanga. She congratulated her husband for choosing a woman as his running mate, a first in her country. Some journalists see her social work as a campaign for her husband in upcoming presidential elections, which the Patriotic Front denies.

The Special Olympics conferred on Lungu the title of 50th Anniversary Ambassador for the African Region, in September 2017, at he 50th anniversary of the Special Olympics Leadership Academy, hosted by Zambia at the Olympic Youth Development Centre.

References

First Ladies of Zambia
Patriotic Front (Zambia) politicians
Living people
Zambian Baptists
Converts to Baptist denominations from Roman Catholicism
1961 births
21st-century Zambian women politicians
21st-century Zambian politicians